West Virginia Route 129 is an east–west state highway located in central West Virginia. The western terminus of the route is at West Virginia Route 39 in Drennen. The eastern terminus of the route is at West Virginia Route 41 in Mount Nebo.

Major intersections

References

129
Transportation in Nicholas County, West Virginia